Egon Rannet (until 1940 Eugen/Jevgeni Brükke; 29 November 1911 – 1 November 1983) was an Estonian writer. Many of his works were affected by socialist realism.

He was born in Tallinn. In the 1930s he was a member of Vaps Movement. During World War II he was in Soviet military service. Since 1947 he was a professional writer.

Works

 novel "Kivid ja leib" (I 1972, II 1985, III 1992, IV 1996)
 short story "Tugevate tee" (1954)
 short story "Kilde Taani-reisilt" (1960)

References

1911 births
1983 deaths
Estonian male novelists
Estonian dramatists and playwrights
Estonian male poets
Estonian screenwriters
Estonian male short story writers
20th-century Estonian novelists
20th-century Estonian poets
20th-century Estonian writers
Writers from Tallinn
Burials at Metsakalmistu